1968 in philosophy

Events

Publications 
 Michael Polanyi, Life's Irreducible Structure (1968)
 Buckminster Fuller, Operating Manual for Spaceship Earth (1968)
 Hans Albert, Treatise on Critical Reason (1968)
 Gilles Deleuze, Difference and Repetition (1968)
 James D. Watson, The Double Helix (1968)
 Jürgen Habermas, Knowledge and Human Interests (originally published in German as Erkenntnis und Interesse; English translation: 1972)

Philosophical literature 
 Philip K. Dick, Do Androids Dream of Electric Sheep? (1968)

Births 
Death years link to the corresponding '[year] in philosophy' article
July 11 – Mark Fisher, 48, British writer, music journalist (The Wire, Fact), and cultural theorist. His most influential work was published in 2009: Capitalist Realism: Is there no alternative? (d. 2017)
 Julian Baggini

Deaths 
 June 4 - Alexandre Kojève (born 1902) 
 December 10 - Karl Barth (born 1886)

References 

Philosophy
20th-century philosophy
Philosophy by year